The Eye of Argon is a heroic fantasy novella that narrates the adventures of Grignr, a mighty barbarian and thief. It was written in 1970 by Jim Theis (1953–2002) and has found notoriety within science fiction fandom since its publication. The quality of the work has made it rank among the books considered the worst. It has been described as "one of the genre's most beloved pieces of appalling prose," the "infamous 'worst fantasy novel ever' published for fans' enjoyment," and "the apotheosis of bad writing," and has subsequently been used as part of a common science fiction convention party game.

History

The novella was written by Jim Theis, a St. Louis, Missouri, science fiction fan, at age 16. The work was first published in 1970 in OSFAN 10, the fanzine of the Ozark Science Fiction Association. Theis was "a malaprop genius, a McGonagall of prose with an eerie gift for choosing the wrong word and then misapplying it," according to David Langford in SFX. Many of Theis's words were also misspelled in the fanzine, which was poorly typed. Theis was not completely happy with the published version and continued to work on the story. In an interview published three months later, he said:

In fact, I have changed it. I went over it for an independent study for English in school. You know, like adjectives changed and places where sentences should be deleted; things of this type. Even so it is nothing to be proud of and yet it is. Because how many people have had their first story published at 16—even if it is in a fanzine or a clubzine? How many writers have written a complete story at so early an age? Even so, "Eye of Argon" isn't great. I basically don't know much about structure or composition.

Sometime in the 1970s, science fiction author Thomas N. Scortia obtained a copy, which he mailed to Californian writer Chelsea Quinn Yarbro. She showed it to others, and it was met with a tremendous and incredulous reaction. Yarbro wrote in an e-mail from late 2003 to Darrell Schweitzer:

Tom Scortia sent me the fanzine pages as a kind of shared amusement, since both of us tended to look for poor use of language in stories. Don Simpson and I were still married then, and one of our entertainments was reading aloud to each other. This work was such a mish-mash that we took turns reading it to each other until we could stand no more...

About two weeks after the story arrived, we had a dinner party, mainly for MWA (Mystery Writers of America) and book dealer friends, and Joe Gores got to talking about some of the really hideous language misuse he had seen in recent anthology submissions and had brought along a few of the most egregious. I mentioned I had something that put his examples in the shade, and brought out "The Eye of Argon." It was a huge hit. [Locus reviewer] Tom Whitmore asked if he could make a copy of it, and I loaned it to him, and readings of it started to become a hideous entertainment. I never typed out a copy of it, but I am afraid I did start the ball rolling.

The work was copied and distributed widely around science fiction fandom, often without Theis's name attached. Readings quickly became a common item on science fiction convention programmes. "People sit in a circle and take turns reading from photocopies of the story. The reader's turn is over when he begins to laugh uncontrollably."

An edition of The Eye of Argon was published in 1987 by Hypatia Press (Eugene, Oregon), illustrated by Lynne Adams. The story was also reprinted in 1995, attributed to "G. Ecordian," after the hero, Grignr the Ecordian.

Later, a version became available on the Internet, ARGON.DOC, which was manually transcribed by Don Simpson and placed online by Doug Faunt. It bears this note at the bottom:

No mere transcription can give the true flavor of the original printing of The Eye of Argon. It was mimeographed with stencils cut on an elite manual typewriter. Many letters were so faint as to be barely readable, others were overstruck, and some that were to be removed never got painted out with correction fluid. Usually, only one space separated sentences, while paragraphs were separated by a blank line and were indented ten spaces. Many words were grotesquely hyphenated. And there were illustrations — I cannot do them justice in mere words, but they were a match for the text. These are the major losses of this version (#02) of TEoA.

Otherwise, all effort has been made to retain the full and correct text, preserving even mis-spellings and dropped spaces. An excellent proofreader has checked it for errors both omitted and committed. What mismatches remain are mine.

However, the online version was found to contain errors when an original copy of the fanzine was discovered in the Paskow Science Fiction Collection at the Temple University Libraries in Philadelphia in 2003.

Finding the lost ending
The ending of The Eye of Argon was missing from Scortia's copy and all the copies made of it. The last page of the story was on the last sheet of the fanzine, which had fallen off the staples. The online version ended with the phrase "-END OF AVAILABLE COPY-". The original copy found in 2003 was also incomplete.

The ending was lost until a complete copy of the fanzine was discovered by the special collections librarian Gene Bundy in the Jack Williamson Science Fiction Library at Eastern New Mexico University in 2005. Bundy reported the discovery to Lee Weinstein, who had found the copy in Philadelphia and published an article, "In Search of Jim Theis," in the New York Review of Science Fiction 195.

In 2006, a trade paperback edition was published by Wildside Press of the complete work.

Plot summary

 Chapter 1 The story starts with a sword fight, in the empire of Noregolia between the Ecordian barbarian Grignr and some mercenaries who are pursuing him. After killing them, Grignr resumes his journey to the Noregolian city of Gorzom in search of wenches and plunder.
 Chapter 2 Grignr arrives in Gorzom and goes to a tavern, where he picks up a local wench (with a "lithe, opaque nose"). A drunken guard challenges him over the woman; he beheads the guard, but is arrested by the man's companions and brought before the local prince, whom he proceeds to insult. Infuriated, the prince (on the advice of his advisor) condemns him to a life of forced labor in the mines. Enraged, Grignr seizes a sword and after running it through the prince's advisor, Agafnd, is about to kill the prince when he is knocked unconscious. This chapter contains the first of several occasions when the word slut is applied to a man, presumably as an insult.
 Chapter 3 Grignr awakens in a dark, dismal cell. He sits despondently, thinking of his homeland.
 Chapter 3½ A scene of a pagan ritual involving a group of shamans (spelled "shamen"), a young woman to be sacrificed, and a grotesque jade idol with one eye: a "many fauceted scarlet emerald", the Eye of Argon.
 Chapter 4 Losing track of time, Grignr sits bored and anguished in his cell. A large rat attacks him and he decapitates it. It then inspires him with a plan, involving the corpse of the rat, which he dismembers.
 Chapter 5 The pagan ritual proceeds, with a priest ordering the young woman up to the altar. When she fails to proceed, he attempts to grope her. She vomits onto the priest, who chokes her. She disables him with a hard kick between the testicles, causing him to ooze ichor, but the other shamans grab and molest her.
 Chapter 6 Grignr is taken from his cell by two soldiers. He takes the rat pelvis he has fashioned into a dagger and slits one soldier's throat. He then strangles the second and takes his clothes, torch, and ax. He wanders the catacombs for a time, finding a storeroom, and narrowly avoids being killed by a booby-trap. Below this room, he finds the palace mausoleum. He resets the booby-trap in case he is being pursued.
He hears a scream apparently coming from a sarcophagus. He opens it to find the scream is coming from below. He opens a trap door to see the pagan ritual. Enraged upon seeing a shaman about to sacrifice the young woman, Grignr plows into the group of shamans with the ax and takes the Eye. The young woman, Carthena, turns out to be the tavern wench. They depart.
 Chapter 7 One priest, who had been suffering an epileptic seizure during Grignr's attack, recovers. Maddened by what he sees, he draws a scimitar and follows Grignr and Carthena through the trap door in the ceiling.
 Chapter 7½ The priest strikes at Grignr but he triggers and is killed by, the reset booby-trap before his sword can connect. Carthena tells Grignr of the prince, Agaphim, who had condemned him to the mines. They encounter Agaphim and kill him, as well as his inexplicably resurrected advisor Agafnd.
As Grignr and Carthena leave, Grignr pulls the Eye of Argon out of his pouch to admire. The jewel melts and turns into a writhing blob with a leechlike mouth. The blob attacks him and begins sucking his blood. Carthena faints. Grignr, beginning to lose consciousness, grabs a torch and thrusts it into the blob's mouth.

Traditional photocopied and Internet versions end at this point, incomplete since page 49 of the fanzine had been lost. The ending was rediscovered in 2004 and published in The New York Review of Science Fiction #198, February 2005.

 The Lost Ending (Remainder of Ch. 7½) The blob explodes into a thousand pieces, leaving nothing behind except "a dark red blotch upon the face of the earth, blotching things up." Grignr and the still-unconscious Carthena ride off into the distance.

Readings

At SF conventions
For a number of years circa the 1990s The Eye of Argon was read aloud, usually as charity events, at several West Coast U.S. science fiction conventions (such as OryCon and LosCon) as well as Northeast U.S. conventions such as 5Con. A panel of volunteers would take turns reading passages, and the audience would bid to stop that passage or continue (for some set number of minutes, or paragraphs after each successful bid).  At some of these events, some members of the audience improvisationally got up to act out the scenes being read, as mime.  All proceeds from these were then given to various charities.  Some of these events were spontaneous, others were officially scheduled.  Usually, they were held late at night or in the wee hours.

As a party game
Reading The Eye of Argon aloud has been made into a game, as described by SF critic Dave Langford in SFX magazine: "The challenge of death, at SF conventions, is to read The Eye of Argon aloud, straight-faced, without choking and falling over. The grandmaster challenge is to read it with a squeaky voice after inhaling helium. What fun we fans have." Strict rules also include not laughing and reading all mistakes exactly as written. Making it through three-quarters of a page is considered an extraordinary accomplishment. To encourage the game, a "Competitive Reading Edition" of the story is freely available, which is a careful copy of the original publication.

Author

James Francis "Jim" Theis (pronounced : (August 9, 1953 – March 26, 2002) wrote The Eye of Argon at age 16. It was published in a fanzine on August 21, 1970, a few days after his 17th birthday. (Theis said in an interview that he was 16 at the time of writing.) He published one more fantasy story in another fanzine, Son of Grafan, in 1972, and later pursued and earned a degree in journalism. His hobbies included collecting books, comics, and German swords. He also collected, traded, and sold tapes of radio programs of the 1930s, '40s, and '50s under the business name The Phantom of Radio Past, advertising in such publications as the Fandom Directory. After his death at age 48, his family requested donations to the American Heart Association.

In an interview with Theis on March 8, 1984, on Hour 25, a talk show on KPFK, the presenters of which would periodically stage a reading of The Eye of Argon, Theis stated that he was hurt that his story was being mocked and said he would never write anything again. In a later interview he complained about being mocked for something he had written thirty years ago, at age sixteen.  He participated in readings of the story in St Louis, e.g. at Archon. A copy of the 1995 reprinting was sent to him, with no response.

Other attributed authors and distributors
Before copies of the original fanzine were rediscovered, the story's authorship was in doubt. Because the novelette was at least once re-typed and photocopied for distribution without provenance, many readers found it hard to believe the story was not a collaborative effort, a satire on bad writing, or both. The webmaster of a now-defunct site called "Wulf's 'Eye of Argon' Shrine" argued that the story "was actually well paced and plotted." He went on to say that, although he didn't believe it himself, "at least one sf professional today claims that the story was a cunning piece of satire passed off as real fan fiction."

David Langford reported the following, sent in by author Michael Swanwick, in Ansible #193:

I had a surprising conversation at Readercon with literary superstar Samuel R. Delany, who told me of how at an early Clarion the students and teachers had decided to see exactly how bad a story they could write if they put their minds to it. Chip [Delany] himself contributed a paragraph to the round robin effort. Its title? "The Eye of Argon".

Langford considers it well known that Theis is the author, and surmises that Delany misremembered the event.

Author Stephen Goldin said that, during a convention, he met a woman who told him she had done the actual mimeographing for the Ozark-area fanzine. Lee Weinstein reports that he had originally heard that Dorothy Fontana had distributed the photocopies. Weinstein, however, later discovered Usenet posts by Richard W. Zellich, who was involved in running the St. Louis, Missouri, area convention Archon. Zellich reported in 1991 posts that Jim Theis was real and attended the convention for years.

What Weinstein calls "the smoking gun...the long missing citation" was a 1994 posting from New York fan Richard Newsome, who transcribed an interview with Theis published in OSFAN 13. The interviewer praised Theis, saying, "When they were kidding you about it, you took it so well....You showed real character." Theis replied, "I mean, it was easier than showing bad character and inviting trouble."

See also

 Amanda McKittrick Ros, novelist whose work was also read aloud in similar competitions.
 My Immortal, a 2006–07 Harry Potter fan fiction also infamous as an example of poorly written literature.
 Fifty Shades of Grey, a story begun as fanfiction with a similar reputation for the low quality of its writing.
 Chuck Tingle, science fiction novelist whose work is known for its ridiculousness.

References

External links

Interview with Jim Theis — OSFAN No. 13, November 21, 1970
The Eye Of Argon — Rules for a Reading by Mary Mason
The Eye of Argon — full text (OSFAN #7)
About The Eye of Argon — David Langford's page with links to the complete text (HTML) and scans of the original fanzine pages (PDF).

1970 short stories
Fantasy short stories
Gemstones in fiction
American science fiction works
American novellas
Heroic fantasy
Heroic fantasy short stories